Gosong is a genus of flowering plants in the family Araceae. It has only one currently accepted species, Gosong brevipedunculata, native to Borneo. G.brevipedunculata is a rheophyte living alongside fastmoving streams.

References

GoSong 
Monotypic Araceae genera
Endemic flora of Borneo
Plants described in 2018
Aroideae